Robert Natus (16 March 1890 – 31 March 1950) was an Estonian architect of Baltic German descent.

Born in Viljandi, Estonia, Natus studied in Tallinn, and at Riga Technical University. In the 1920s, together with Ernst Gustav Kühnert, he drew the general plans for the garden cities of Merivälja and Nõmme, both just outside Tallinn (Nõmme was merged into Tallinn in 1940). His best known work is the current City Hall of Tallinn, built in 1932. With its red clinker mosaique façade and lanterns by the Estonian sculptor Jaan Koort, it is the most prominent building in Freedom Square, and the most notable example of expressionist art deco in Tallinn.

Red clinker mosaique was soon used on another of Natus' well known buildings, on the corner of Pärnu and Roosikrantsi street, only a few hundred meters from the City Hall. This building was inspired by Johann Friedrich Höger's Chilehaus in Hamburg.

Natus also created several functionalistic apartment buildings and private dwellings.

In 1939, Natus moved to Germany, later dying in Bad Wilsnack, Germany.

Gallery

See also
List of Baltic German architects

References

1890 births
1950 deaths
People from Viljandi
People from the Governorate of Livonia
Baltic-German people
Modernist architects
Riga Technical University alumni
20th-century Estonian architects